Alpanu sometimes spelt Alpnu or Alpan was an Etruscan goddess of the underworld. She is shown as wearing jewellery, a loose cloak, and sandals. She is otherwise naked, and for this reason is believed to also have been a goddess of sexual activity.

See also
List of Etruscan mythological figures

References
 Encyclopedia of Gods, Michael Jordan, New York City, Facts on File, 1993.

Etruscan goddesses
Underworld goddesses
Love and lust goddesses